There are several hundred Kyrgyz in Pakistan, most of whom are immigrants based in the northern areas of the country. They have historically inhabited the Gojal valley of Gilgit-Baltistan. Pakistan's Broghil Pass, situated between Chitral and the Wakhan Corridor, also once had a large resident Kyrgyz community. Some hail from the town of Uzgen in the west of Kyrgyzstan; in addition, many were previously settled in the Little Pamir valley of the Wakhan corridor in Afghanistan. They fled to Pakistan in the aftermath of the Afghan Saur Revolution, leaving much of their wealth and animal herds behind.

History
During the 1980s, as many as 1,129 Kyrgyz refugees in Pakistan were subsequently allowed asylum and resettlement in eastern Turkey. 
 
Up to this day, Kyrgyz farmers and herders from Pamir (Afghanistan) frequently visit the bordering Hunza valley of Pakistan to engage in livestock breeding and limited barter trade with entrepreneurs.

Like other Central Asian expatriates, many Kyrgyz migrants apply for Pakistani nationality and identity cards, often deliberately losing or hiding their passports in the process. According to Pakistani interior officials, they take advantage of their cultural assimilation by introducing themselves as Pakistan-based Pashtuns living in other countries who came to the country to spend vacation and "lost their credentials."

The Kyrgyz in Pakistan have an active involvement in trade and maintain a broad network of business companies in various states, including neighbouring China. They also have played an extensive role in promoting and assisting the development of tourism in Kyrgyzstan.

Many of the Pakistanis in Kyrgyzstan who fled the 2010 South Kyrgyzstan riots brought back Kyrgyz spouses and families to Pakistan with them.
One of the obstacles faced by their Kyrgyz relatives included registration of travel documents; most did not have proper documentation and some were issued visas by the Federal Investigation Agency for only three days, resulting in people being declared illegal immigrants.

In October 2010, several dozen Kyrgyz nationals, mostly diplomats living in Islamabad and other cities, took part in voting for the parliamentary elections running in Kyrgyzstan. The polling was organised at the local embassy.

Wakhan Kyrgyz refugees 
Kyrgyz from Wakhan region of Afghanistan moved to Pakistan in the 1970s. Nearly 1,100 of these were accepted by Turkey to settle in Ulupamir (or “Great Pamir” in Kyrgyz), their resettlement village in Van Province.

See also
 Kyrgyzstan–Pakistan relations
 Pakistanis in Kyrgyzstan
 Kyrgyz people#In Afghanistan

References

Further reading
 The Kirghiz and Wakhi of Afghanistan: adaptation to closed frontiers and war, M. Nazif Mohib Shahrani
 The Kyrgyz – Children of Manas. Кыргыздар – Манастын балдары

External links
 Embassy of Kyrgyzstan, Islamabad

Ethnic groups in Pakistan
Immigration to Pakistan
Pakistan 
Kyrgyzstan–Pakistan relations